"Only Love" is a song written by Roger Murrah and Marcus Hummon, and recorded by American country music artist Wynonna. It was released in July 1993 as the second single from the album Tell Me Why.  The song reached number 3 on the Billboard Hot Country Singles & Tracks chart.

Chart performance

Year-end charts

References

1993 singles
1993 songs
Wynonna Judd songs
Songs written by Roger Murrah
Songs written by Marcus Hummon
Song recordings produced by Tony Brown (record producer)
MCA Records singles
Curb Records singles